Small blue kingfisher is a common name for several birds and may refer to:

Alcedo atthis, widely distributed in Eurasia and North Africa
Alcedo coerulescens, native to Indonesia